Accordéon Mélancolique is a Dutch accordion duo consisting of Cherie de Boer (born 10 June 1950 in Jakarta) and Jean-Pierre Guiran (born 27 January 1957 in Vlissingen).

The duo is founded in 1984. In 1997 they were asked to play during the fiftieth anniversary of the Marshall-plan in Rotterdam, the Netherlands, for, among others, Bill en Hillary Clinton, Dutch crown prince Willem Alexander and former Dutch prime minister Wim Kok. Their first CD L'Imparfait du Cœur was released in 1998, and was proclaimed by the Swedish accordion magazine Dragspels Nytt as the best accordion CD of 1999. As a result, they played at various festivals in Iceland and Denmark during the summer of 2000 and 2003. In total, seven CDs have been released. The music is also published as sheet music.

Style 
The duo plays increasingly more original compositions. Their inspiration comes from French accordion music, French musette waltzes, Italian folk music, Antillean waltzes, Indonesian kronchong melodies, Argentinean tangos, Jewish and Greek folk music, swing standards, Gypsy romantics, classical music, merengues and tex-mex. A central theme is the role of silence in music.

Discography

CDs

Sheet music

Compositions J.P. Guiran 

The compositions of Jean-Pierre Guiran are distinguished by the central role of the melody. The expressiveness is strengthened by timing in various rhythms and by the harmony which receives the role of a second voice.

2015 
 Mermaid
 Quicksand
 Swan & Swan
 Aquarelle d’Amour
 Warm Bath
 Damselfly
 Meeting at the Lake
 Watering Place
 Ducklings
 the Heron and the Frog
 Water Cave
 Swell
 Swimming in the Winter
 Lullaby to the Sea
 Ebb and Flow

2012 
 Eléphants Blancs
 Swiss Affair
 Gratitude I
 Gratitude II
 Gratitude III
 Bailamos la Vida
 Sans Queue ni Tête
 The Singing Moon
 Seaside
 Cinquante
 Santiago
 Rose de Salon

2008 
 L'Arrivée des Invités
 Bougainville
 Clandestin
 The Dancing Tortoise
 Ma Chérie
 Padiki Dikitika
 Por el Camino Real (co-author)
 Requiem pour une Rose
 Tonton Charles
 Tanah Tumpah Darah

2006 
 Appelboom
 L'Esprit du Sud
 L'Heure Bleue
 Juif Errant
 Kripi Kripi
 Le Lac Minor
 Le Nid Aimé
 Maria Clara
 Merel
 Mon Chéri
 Solitude Heureuse
 Te Lang Alleen
 Within Five Minutes!

2003 
 Cirque Mazurque

2002 
 Café Vert
 Helena
 Mango
 Parade des Poules
 Tres Corazones (co-author)
 Une Valse Anglaise S.V.P.

1998 
 L'Imparfait du Cœur
 Passé composé

1997 
 Polytour

Usage of music

Documentaries
 Broken Dreams. Suzanne van Leendert, van Osch Films, the Netherlands, 2015.
 Portret van een Tuin. Rosie Stapel, the Netherlands, 2014.
 Boi, Song of a Wanderer. Anne Marie Borsboom Filmproducties, the Netherlands, 2014.
 Appie Baantjer als Diender. Profiel. KRO, the Netherlands, 2008.
 Boren in de Zeebodem. Schooltv, the Netherlands, 2005.
 De Koperen Ploeg. Kristie Stevens, the Netherlands, 2005.
 Oud en der Dagen Zat. IKON, the Netherlands, 2003.
 Picasso and Braque Go to the Movies. Martin Scorsese. United States, 2008.
 Dag je dat wij niks leerde?. Ed van Herpt and Gwen Timmer. Stichting Filmgroep Parabel, the Netherlands, 1981.

Films
 Something Fishy. Puppet animation. Foolhardy Films, scenario Trevor Hardy. UK, 2012.
 De Laatste Dag. Director Saskia Diesing, scenario Helena van der Meulen. Lemming Film, the Netherlands, 2008.
 If God Wants. Diennet Productions, United States, 2009.

Theatre
 Because There Isn't Any. Johannes Wieland. Performed by the Juilliard School of Arts, New York, United States, 2008.
 Petites Histoires.com. Kader Atou. Compagnie Accrorap, France, 2008. Performed, among others, in France, the Netherlands, the United States and China.
 Resemblance. Dancers: Melanie Aceto en Claire Jacob-Zysman. Melanie Aceto Contemporary Dance, New York, United States, 2006.
 EWES. Amaury Lebrun. Performed by Compañía Nacional de Danza II, Madrid, Spain, 2010.

Tv-drama
 Man bijt Hond. NCRV, the Netherlands, Dolle Dries Sterke Zeemansverhalen 2013 / 2014, Dave & Annu 2009. 
 De Troon. Avro, the Netherlands, 2010.

References

External links 

 

Dutch musical duos
Musical groups established in 1984
1984 establishments in the Netherlands
Male–female musical duos